HD 130948 or HP Boötis is a variable star with 2 brown dwarfs in the constellation Boötes. It has a stellar classification of G1V, which means it is a main sequence star with a mass and surface temperature that are similar to the Sun. The estimated age of this star is also similar to the Sun at 4.7 billion years (Gyr) old, but it has a lower proportion of elements (63%) other than hydrogen or helium.

In 2002, a pair of co-orbiting brown dwarfs were discovered in orbit around this star. They were found using an adaptive optics instrument on the Gemini North 8m telescope in Hawaii. The pair have a 10-year orbital period about the primary star, and their combined mass is 10.9% of the Sun's mass.

The space velocity components of this star through the Milky Way galaxy are  = .

References

Boötes
BY Draconis variables
130948
072567
G-type main-sequence stars
Bootis, HP
0564
Durchmusterung objects
5534